The 1973 New Brunswick electoral redistribution was the most radical redistribution of electoral districts in the history of New Brunswick, Canada.  Under this redistribution, New Brunswick changed from a mixture of multi-member districts and single-member districts to a scheme of only single-member districts, from bloc voting electoral system to first past the post.

As the number of members per district had been re-evaluated as recently as 1967, the number of members was not changed, and multi-member districts were simply subdivided to form single-member districts.

Prior to the redistribution, New Brunswick had had the longest and deepest experience of multi-member districts of any province in Canada. The Block voting system in use though denied voters the proportional representation that they might otherwise have enjoyed.

Transition of districts

List of electoral districts
(each district returns one member)

Albert
Bathurst
Bay du Vin
Campbellton
Caraquet
Carleton Centre
Carleton North
Carleton South
Charlotte Centre
Charlotte-Fundy
Charlotte West
Chatham
Dalhousie
East Saint John
Edmundston
Fredericton North
Fredericton South
Grand Falls
Kent Centre
Kent North
Kent South
Kings Centre
Kings East
Kings West
Madawaska Centre
Madawaska-les-Lacs
Madawaska South
Memramcook
Miramichi Bay
Miramichi-Newcastle
Moncton East
Moncton North
Moncton West
Nepisiguit-Chaleur
Nigadoo-Chaleur
Oromocto
Petitcodiac
Queens North
Queens South
Restigouche East
Restigouche West
Riverview
Saint John-Fundy
Saint John Harbour
Saint John North
Saint John Park
Saint John South
Saint John West
St. Stephen-Milltown
Shediac
Shippagan-les-Îles
Southwest Miramichi
Sunbury
Tantramar
Tracadie
Victoria-Tobique
York North
York South

References

Politics of New Brunswick
Electoral redistributions in Canada
New Brunswick Legislature
1973 in politics
1973 in Canadian politics
1973 in New Brunswick